Midnight (German: Mitternacht) is a 1918 German silent crime film directed by Ewald André Dupont and starring Max Landa, Karl Beckersachs and Reinhold Schünzel.

Cast 
 Max Landa as Max, Detective
 Karl Beckersachs as Donald Gordon (Kapitän) 
 Heinrich Peer as Dorian Morny (Graf) 
 Erich Rahn as Jiu-Jitsu-Meister 
 Reinhold Schünzel as Dick Tillinghaft (Reporter) 
 Adolf Paul as Alex Smirnow (Graf) 
 Wilhelm Diegelmann as Jimmy 
 Leopold von Ledebur as Präsident der Republik 
 Margarete Ferida as Helene Trevor (Frau) 
 Anneliese Halbe as Beatrice Trevor (Stieftochter)
 Martin Lübbert as Alfred Clark (Trevors Sekretär 
 Maria Pospichil as Frau MacAllister 
 Eberhard Wrede as Kriminalkommissar 
 Hugo Werner-Kahle as Edmund Trevor 
 Olga Wojan

References

Bibliography
 Bock, Hans-Michael & Bergfelder, Tim. The Concise CineGraph. Encyclopedia of German Cinema. Berghahn Books, 2009.

External links

1918 films
Films of the German Empire
German silent feature films
Films directed by E. A. Dupont
German crime films
1918 crime films
German black-and-white films
1910s German films
1910s German-language films